The Antilles leaf-toed gecko (Hemidactylus palaichthus), also known as the Maria Islands leaf-toed gecko or spiny gecko, is a gecko species found in northern South America and the Lesser Antilles. It can be found on small rocks and islets offshore of Saint Lucia, Trinidad, and Tobago, though it is absent from the main islands.

Habitat and conservation
Hemidactylus palaichthus occurs in tropical savannas, dry forests, and rainforests. It can occur in disturbed habitats (scrubby second growth, or on isolated vegetation (palms, logs) in pastures) and villages (on walls and posts). It is common in parts of its range is not facing any major threat.

References

Hemidactylus
gecko
gecko
Reptiles of Brazil
Reptiles of Colombia
Reptiles of Guyana
Reptiles of Saint Lucia
Reptiles of Suriname
Reptiles of Trinidad and Tobago
Reptiles of Venezuela
Reptiles described in 1969
Taxa named by Arnold G. Kluge